AQM Bazlul Karim (1920–1998) was a Bangladeshi educationist and soil scientist.

Early life and education
Karim was born on 1 February 1920 in Kalma village in Lohajang Upazila of Munshiganj District. He passed SSC, HSC and BSc examinations in 1936, 1938 and 1940 respectively. He obtained MSc degree in chemistry in 1942 from Aligarh Muslim University. In 1945, he left for London and got admitted as a PhD. student in agricultural chemistry at Imperial College London. He received his Ph.D. in 1948 with a thesis titled "Residual effect of fertilizers on the growth and yield of potatoes".

Career
Karim started his career as a civil servant in Calcutta under Food Ministry, later joined as Junior Lecturer in Jadabpur College and finally as a gazetted officer in chemical standardization laboratory under Food and Drug Ministry.

After returning from London, Karim joined the newly established Department of Soil Science in University of Dhaka as senior Lecturer in 1949 with M Osman Ghani, AKMF Huq, Abdul Karim and Hatem Ali as his colleagues in the department. He became a Reader in 1952. He received an offer as visiting scientist by the American Academy of Sciences and joined the Department of Soil Science and Botany in Davis Campus of the University of California, Barkley. He worked there until 1961. After coming back from USA, he became the head of Soil Science Department of DU and by the end of 1962 he became Professor. In 1967, he accepted the post of Director General of a project entitled Soil Survey of Pakistan and again returned to his original post of Professor of DU at the end of 1969.

He continued in this post until he was appointed as the chairman of the Bangladesh public service commission of independent Bangladesh in July 1972 and stayed there for five years.

In 1978, he again joined Dhaka University and continued until his retirement on 30 June 1982. Karim, in addition to his teaching assignment, had been presidents of Dhaka University Teachers Association, Federation of Bangladesh University Teachers Association and soil science society of Bangladesh.

Awards
 President's Gold Medal (1974)
 Sher-e-Bangla Gold Medal (1982) for education
 Atish Dipankar Gold Medal (1984)
 Ekushey Padak (2000), posthumously.

Personal life and death
Karim had two sons, Yusuf Mahbubul Karim and Ahmed Karim and two daughters Niloufer Karim and Priti Karim. Karim died on 6 September 1998.

1998 deaths
1920 births
Bangladeshi soil scientists
Academic staff of the University of Dhaka
Recipients of the Independence Day Award
Recipients of the Ekushey Padak
Indian expatriates in the United Kingdom
Indian emigrants to Pakistan